Banana boat may refer to:

Transport

Aircraft
 "Banana Boat", nickname for Consolidated B-24 Liberator, an American World War II bomber

Vessels
 Banana boat (aircraft carrier), an informal RAF slang term
 Banana boat (boat), an unpowered recreational boat
 Banana boat (ship), a ship whose primary role is the transportation of bananas as cargo

Art, entertainment, and media
 Banana Boat, a Polish a cappella group created in 1994
 "Day-O (The Banana Boat Song)", a 1956 traditional Jamaican folk song
 Banana Boat, an alternate slang term related to the phrase Fresh off the boat for newly arrived immigrants
 Banana Boat Team, the nickname for the group of NBA players Carmelo Anthony, LeBron James, Chris Paul and Dwyane Wade

Brands and enterprises
 Banana Boat, a brand of sunscreen manufactured by Sun Pharmaceuticals Corp, a subsidiary of Edgewell Personal Care

Food, drink, and related items
 Banana boat (food), a campfire dish consisting of a banana stuffed with marshmallow and chocolate
Banana boat, a liqueur-based cocktail 
Banana boat, a dish used to serve the banana split dessert